Amish lethal microcephaly is a rare genetic disorder which is characterized by severe microcephaly (small head) from birth, brain hypoplasia (underdeveloped brain), micrognathia (small chin), irritability (at second or third month of age), seizures, problems controlling their body temperature, high levels of alpha-ketogluraic acid in their urine, and less commonly hepatomegaly (large liver). Babies with this condition typically die when they are 6 months old. This disorder was named after the Amish since, in Old Order Amish communities in Pennsylvania, it affects 1 in 500 babies, while 1 in 11 people in the same communities are unaffected carriers of the (recessive) mutation that causes the disorder, it has not been found outside this population.

This disorder is caused by mutations in the SLC25A19 gene in chromosome 17q25, it follows an autosomal recessive inheritance pattern

References 

Autosomal recessive disorders
Rare genetic syndromes
Medical genetics
Syndromes with microcephaly